The Eberhard Faber Pencil Company was started by John Eberhard Faber in 1861 in Midtown Manhattan, New York City by the East River at the foot of 42nd Street, on the present site of the United Nations Headquarters. After an 1872 fire, operations moved to the Eberhard Faber Pencil Factory in Greenpoint, Brooklyn, across the East River, which was acquired by Staedtler, a stationery company with global presence, in 1978. This factory was acquired by Faber-Castell USA in 1994 before being bought by Newell (Sanford) and eventually rolled into the Paper Mate brand.

Eberhard Faber had a lumber mill on Atsena Otie Key, near Cedar Key, Florida until it was destroyed following the 1896 Cedar Keys hurricane.

A German subsidiary was founded in 1922 in Neumarkt, near Nuremberg, Germany by sons Eberhard and Lothar.

Leonard E. Read (1898-1983) in his 1958 Essay "I, Pencil" detailed the economic ‘Free Market’ benefit to the world economy of a ‘Mongol 482’ Eberhard Faber pencil.

See also 
 Faber-Castell

References

Further reading

External links 
 
 English version of the company's web homepage
 Genealogical Tree of the Faber-family, showcasing the traditional relation to Faber-Castell
 Eberhard Faber's erasers

Defunct manufacturing companies based in New York City
Newell Brands
Manufacturing companies established in 1861
Manufacturing companies disestablished in 1994
1861 establishments in New York (state)
1994 disestablishments in New York (state)
1994 mergers and acquisitions